In anatomy for cardiac muscle, fascia adherens are ribbon-like structures that stabilize non-epithelial tissue. They are similar in function and structure to the zonula adherens or adherens junction of epithelial cells. It is a broad intercellular junction in the transversal sections of an intercalated disc of cardiac muscle anchoring actin filaments. It helps to transmit contractile forces.

See also
Fascia

References

Cardiovascular system
Fascia